Tear Ceremony is an American electronic and industrial band fronted by Todd Gautreau that was active in the late 1990s.
Gautreau then changed his moniker to Sonogram as the music became less dark and more optimistic. Gautreau also currently fronts the indie rock band Crushed Stars.
After a SXSW appearance, Crushed Stars signed to Portland's Arena Rock Records. They returned to SXSW and CMJ the following year.
Crushed Stars has worked with such producers as Stuart Sikes (Cat Power, White Stripes) and John  Congleton (The Walkmen, Modest Mouse)
In 2010, Crushed Stars had a college radio it with a psychedelic cover of Nena's 99 Red Balloons. Both Crushed Stars and Sonogram now record for Simulacra Records.

Gautreau returned to ambient music in 2014 with his new project Tapes and Topographies. A second Tapes and Topographies record "Soft Decibels" was released in 2016 and a third, "Signal to Noise" in 2017.

Discography
An Hourglass of Opals (Machinery Records)
Resin (Simulacra Records)
Film Decay (Simulacra Records)
Emulsion (Simulacra Records)

External links
Official website

American industrial music groups
American electronic music groups